Thanassakis o politevomenos is a 1956 Greek comedy film made by Finos Films.  It was directed by Alekos Sakellarios and starring Dinos Iliopoulos, Byron Pallis and Anna Synodinou.  The movie remained in history as the greatest acting from the microbes of politics and its politicians.

Plot

A young girl from a great cod fishers that returned from Switzerland after the end of their studies of the married one with a young scientist Thanassakis, that they returned to Greece lonely and he "ran" as a politician. With the financial help from his brother-in-law that came from the elections without knowing.  Quickly he proclaimed new elections and tried to run again, he asked repeatedly for his financial aid of his brother-in-law in which struck a code from the running that a new elective expedition that was his economic rule. He made an extorsive use that made from the election without a small success.

Cast 
 Dinos Iliopoulos as Meletis Kaplanis
 Anna Synodinou as Mary Kaplani-Govotsou
 Byron Pallis as Thanasakis Govotsos
 Kakia Panagiotou as Eleni Kaplani
 Giorgos Moutsios as SAS pilot
 Joly Garbi as Katina Kaplani
 Despo Diamantidou as Sophia

External links

Thanassakis o politevomenos at cine.gr

1956 films
1956 comedy films
1950s Greek-language films
Finos Film films
Greek comedy films
Greek black-and-white films